The Fokker S.IV was a military trainer aircraft produced in the Netherlands in the mid-1920s. It was a conventional, single-bay biplane with staggered wings of unequal span braced with N-struts, essentially a radial-engined development of the S.III. The pilot and instructor sat in tandem, open cockpits and the undercarriage was of fixed, tailskid type with a cross-axle between the main units. The Royal Netherlands Army Aviation Group purchased 30 examples and used them right up to the German invasion of the Netherlands in 1940. On 14 May that year, a few surviving S.IVs escaped to France alongside some S.IX trainers, but never flew again.

The S.IV could be powered by a variety of engines in the  range, including  Siemens-Halske Sh 11,  Le Rhône 9J,  Bristol Lucifer,  Armstrong-Siddeley Mongoose,  Oberursel UR.II or the  Clerget 9B.

Units using this aircraft/Operators (choose)

Royal Netherlands Air Force

Specifications

References

External links
 Уголок неба

1920s Dutch military trainer aircraft
S.IV
Biplanes
Single-engined tractor aircraft
Aircraft first flown in 1924
Rotary-engined aircraft